is a Japanese professional wrestling promotion based in Shinjuku, Tokyo, Japan. The promotion was founded in 2015 as a sub-brand of DDT Pro-Wrestling and was essentially a relaunch of Union Pro Wrestling, acquired by DDT in 2005. On January 1, 2020, Basara became an independent promotion.

History

Basara in DDT (2015–2019)
Having been active between 1993 and 1995, Union Pro Wrestling (UPW) was revived by DDT Pro-Wrestling (DDT) in 2005, with shows headlined by Poison Sawada, Shuji Ishikawa and Isami Kodaka. On October 4, 2015, UPW held its last show, celebrating its 10th anniversary. On October 7, Kodaka announced the formation of a new promotion that would replace UPW, named Pro-Wrestling Basara. Basara was founded to "do something rebellious against the new, flashy style of wrestling". The Union Max Championship, formerly the top prize in Union Pro, was kept to be contested as the only singles championship in Basara.

Independence (2020–present)
On June 11, 2019, it was announced Basara would be splitting up from DDT and become an independent company starting January 1, 2020. In October 2019, the third edition of the annual "Iron Fist Tag Tournament" led to the creation of Basara's first tag team championship, the Iron Fist Tag Team Championship. Since its independence, Basara has had partnerships with other Japanese promotions such as Dove Pro Wrestling or Wrestling of Darkness 666, and has used the UWA World Trios Championship as its trios title along with Big Japan Pro Wrestling.

Roster

There are four central units in Basara:
Aijin Tag
Asian Kung Fu Revolution
Sento Minzoku
Sparky

Alumni/guests
Kaji Tomato
Leo Isaka
Tank Nagai

Championships

Tournaments

Broadcaster
Niconico (2020–present)

See also

Professional wrestling in Japan
List of professional wrestling promotions in Japan

References

Notes

Footnotes

External links

Basara on Battle-News.com

2015 establishments in Japan
Entertainment companies established in 2019
Shinjuku
Japanese professional wrestling promotions
Pro-Wrestling Basara